Patrik Hersley (born June 23, 1986) is a Swedish former professional ice hockey defenceman.

Playing career
Being a native of Malmö and beginning his career in Malmö Redhawks, at the time regularly oscillating between Elitserien (SHL) and HockeyAllsvenskan, Hersley was drafted by the Los Angeles Kings in the fifth round as the 139th player in the 2005 NHL Entry Draft. Hersley was traded from the Kings to the Philadelphia Flyers, along with Ned Lukacevic, in exchange for Denis Gauthier and a second round choice in the 2010 NHL Entry Draft on July 1, 2008. On September 23, 2009, Hersley was traded by the Flyers to the Nashville Predators for future considerations.

After two years in the North American ice hockey scene and another two back with the Redhawks in Malmö, as well as a brief stint with Modo Hockey, Hersley was signed to a two-year extension contract during the 2011–12 season with Leksands IF on March 13, 2012.

While having his true breakthrough season in 2013–14, Hersley scored his 22nd goal of the season on February 8, 2014, setting a new record for the number of goals by a defenceman in an SHL regular season. He also scored a hat trick while playing against Örebro HK. The previous record was set by Jan Huokko, also for Leksands IF, in the 1998–99 season with 21 goals. Hersley added another two goals to finish the regular season with 24 goals. He was awarded the Salming Trophy, as the best defenceman in the SHL, for the 2013–14 season.

After the season, Hersley signed a one-year contract with Russian club, HC Sibir Novosibirsk in the KHL for the 2014–15 season.

After three successful seasons with SKA Saint Petersburg, Hersley left as a free agent to continue in the KHL with HC Spartak Moscow, agreeing to a one-year contract on 19 June 2019.

As a free agent from Spartak, Hersley opted to return to his native Malmö, signing a one-year contract with the Redhawks on November 9, 2020.

Career statistics

Regular season and playoffs

International

Awards and honors

References

External links

1986 births
Ice hockey players at the 2018 Winter Olympics
Leksands IF players
Living people
Lokomotiv Yaroslavl players
Los Angeles Kings draft picks
Malmö Redhawks players
Manchester Monarchs (AHL) players
Modo Hockey players
Olympic ice hockey players of Sweden
Philadelphia Phantoms players
Reading Royals players
HC Sibir Novosibirsk players
SKA Saint Petersburg players
HC Spartak Moscow players
Sportspeople from Malmö
Swedish ice hockey defencemen